In every area of the world there are major soft drink producers. However, a few major North American companies are present in most of the countries of the world, such as Pepsi and Coca-Cola.

Producers by region

North America 
 The Coca-Cola Company
 Jones Soda
 Keurig Dr Pepper
 National Beverage
 Niagara Bottling
 Novamex
 Pascual Boing: leading soft drink producer in Mexico since The Coca-Cola Company bought Jugos del Valle in 2007
 PepsiCo
 Primo Water
 RC Cola
 Reed's

South America 

 Ajegroup: (Peruvian origin, operates in 14 countries, now headquartered in Mexico), producers of Big Cola, Cielo (mineral water), Cifrut (fruit juice), Free Tea, Free World Light (referred to locally as Free Light), Kola Real, Oro, Pulp (nectar), Sporade (sports drink) and Volt (energy drink)
 AmBev: (Brazil, operates in 14 countries, owned by Anheuser-Busch InBev), the largest bottler of Pepsi Cola products outside the United States, also produces Guarana Antarctica, Soda Limonada, Sukita, H2OH! and Guara!
 Corporación José R. Lindley S.A.: (Peru), producers of Aquarius (flavored water), Burn (energy drink), Coca-Cola, Crush, Fanta, Frugos (nectar), Inca Kola, Kola Inglesa, Powerade (energy drink), San Luis (mineral water) and Sprite
 Embotelladora Don Jorge S.A.C.: (Peru), producers of Agua Vida (mineral water), Click (fruit drink), Isaac Kola and Perú Cola (energy drink)

Europe 
Barr
Brite
Britvic
Epsa
Farsons
Kofola
Schweppes
Sumol + Compal

Africa 
 Hamoud Boualem Founded in 1878 in Algiers, exports its products to Europe and Canada.

Middle East 
 Drinko
 Zamzam

East Asia 
 Fraser and Neave
 HeySong Corporation
 Oceanic Beverages Co., Inc.
 Ramune
 Vitasoy

India
 Bisleri
 Bovonto
 Dabur
 Parle

Pakistan
 Murree Brewery
 Amrat Cola
Gourmet Cola

Australia
 Bickford's Australia
 Bundaberg Brewed Drinks
 Coca-Cola Amatil
 Noosa Beverages
 Saxbys Soft Drinks
 Schweppes Australia
 Trend Drinks
 Tru Blu Beverages

Japan 
 Asahi Soft Drinks
 Ito En
 Kirin Beverage Corporation (same group as Kirin Brewery Company)
 Suntory

See also

 List of brand name soft drink products
 List of soft drink flavors
 List of soft drinks by country

References 

Soft Drinks
Soft Drinks